William Henry Potter (20 August 1847 – 10 April 1920) was an English cricketer active in 1870 who played for Lancashire. He was born in Gufsey, India, and died in Borehamwood. He appeared in one first-class match, scoring 23 runs with a highest score of 12.

Notes

1847 births
1920 deaths
English cricketers
Lancashire cricketers